Conner Frankamp (born July 16, 1995) is an American professional basketball player for Gaziantep Basketbol of the Basketbol Süper Ligi and the FIBA Europe Cup. He played college basketball for the Kansas Jayhawks and Wichita State. He was named to the third team all-Missouri Valley Conference as a junior, averaging 9 points and 3 assists per game. Frankamp entered the 2018 NBA Draft but was not selected in the draft's two rounds.

High school career
Frankamp played for Wichita North High School in Wichita, Kansas under coach Gary Squires. During high school, he was a four-star recruit who was ranked No. 46 in the ESPN 100 and No. 34 on Rivals’ Class of 2013 list. As a senior at Wichita North, he averaged 31.1 points, 3.8 assists, 3.5 rebounds and 2.5 steals per game and, for the second-straight year, was tabbed as one of Kansas’ top five players for all classifications by The Wichita Eagle.

College career
Frankamp played for one season for the Kansas Jayhawks and for three seasons with Wichita State. During his first college year with Kansas, Frankamp was a bench player, averaging 2.6 points per game. The next year, he transferred to Wichita State. During his tenure with the team, Frankamp was named to the Third team All-Missouri Valley Conference as a junior and was the Missouri Valley Conference MVP the same year. As a senior, he averaged 10.6 points and 2.2 assists per game with the Shockers.

Professional career

Beroe
After going undrafted at the 2018 NBA Draft, Frankamp joined Beroe of the NBL, He went on to average 19.3 points and 4.3 assists per game.

Rethymno Cretan Kings
The following year, Frankamp was added to the Los Angeles Lakers Summer League roster but only appeared in three games and was not offered a contract by the team. Later this season, he joined Rethymno Cretan Kings of the Greek Basket League. During the season, Frankamp played in the Greek League All-Star game and competed in the three point contest. (20.8 points and 4.1 assists per game).

Murcia
On June 9, 2020, Frankamp signed with UCAM Murcia of the Liga ACB. He scored 24 points in a 93–80 win against Movistar Estudiantes on September 24.

Zenit Saint Petersburg
On June 21, 2021, Frankamp officially signed with Russian club Zenit Saint Petersburg of the VTB United League and the EuroLeague.

He left the team after the 2022 Russian invasion of Ukraine.

Promitheas Patras
On April 8, 2022, Frankamp returned to Greece, signing with Promitheas Patras. On May 13 of the same year, he abruptly parted ways with the club, just before the start of the Greek Basket League playoffs. In only 8 games, Frankamp averaged 13.3 points, 1.7 rebounds, 1.7 assists and 1 steal, playing around 27 minutes per contest.

Limoges
On May 18, 2022, he has signed with CSP Limoges of the LNB Pro A.

Gaziantep Basketbol 
On July 14, 2022, he signed with Gaziantep Basketbol of the Basketbol Süper Ligi and the FIBA Europe Cup.

AfterShocks
Frankamp has played for the AfterShocks, a team of Wichita State alumni, competing in The Basketball Tournament (TBT), an annual single-elimination bracket tournament.

Career statistics

Domestic Leagues

Regular season

|-
| 2018–19
| style="text-align:left;"| Beroe
| align=center | NBL
| 30 || 28.1 || .520 || .486 || .848 || 2.6 || 4.2 || 1.3 || .1 || 19.3
|}

References

External links
Whichita State Shockers bio
RealGM profile

1995 births
Living people
American expatriate basketball people in Bulgaria
American expatriate basketball people in Greece
American expatriate basketball people in Spain
American men's basketball players
Basketball players from Kansas
CB Murcia players
Kansas Jayhawks men's basketball players
Liga ACB players
Parade High School All-Americans (boys' basketball)
Point guards
Promitheas Patras B.C. players
Rethymno B.C. players
Wichita State Shockers men's basketball players